Howz-e Hafez (also Romanized as Ḩowẕ-e Ḩāfez̧, Ḩowz-e Ḩāfez̧, and Hauz-i-Hāfiz) is a village in Dokuheh Rural District, Seh Qaleh District, Sarayan County, South Khorasan Province, Iran. At the 2006 census, its population was 20, in 4 families.

References 

Populated places in Sarayan County